Pinocchio is a 2002 Italian fantasy comedy-drama film co-written and directed by Roberto Benigni, who also stars. It is based on the 1883 novel The Adventures of Pinocchio by Carlo Collodi, with Benigni portraying Pinocchio. Filming took place in Italy and Kalkara, Malta. It was dedicated to costume and production designer Danilo Donati, who died on 1 December 2001.

The film was released in Italy on 11 October 2002 by Medusa Distribuzione, which was met with mixed reviews. It received an English-language dub in the United States in December 2002, released by Miramax Films; this version was critically panned. Pinocchio was selected as the Italian entry for the Best Foreign Language Film at the 75th Academy Awards, but it was not nominated.

Plot
A magical log falls off a wagon, stopping at Geppetto's door. The wood carver creates a puppet from the log and names it Pinocchio. Pinocchio comes to life and runs away in the streets, turning the town upside down. The carpenter is blamed and taken to prison by the carabinieri, while Pinocchio escapes.

Back home, a Talking Cricket scolds him for his behavior; this annoys Pinocchio, so he tries to hit him with a hammer. Tired and hungry, Pinocchio promises to his father that he will go to school and study. Geppetto returns home from prison and sold his only coat to buy schoolbooks for him, however the naughty puppet goes on several adventures, dreading school.

Joining a puppet theater, Pinocchio is almost eaten by the giant puppet master Mangiafuoco. Lying to get out of the situation, he is given five gold coins. He then meets The Fox and the Cat, who trick him out of his money, telling him to plant it to grow a 'money tree' in the Miracle Meadow near the town of "Grab-A-Dimwit". A Blue Fairy encourages Pinocchio to give up his obnoxious ways, and saves him from being hanged. After being examined by the Owl, the Crow, and the Talking Cricket, Pinocchio experiences the side-effect of his lying. She gives Pinocchio medicine and when he refuses it, coffin-bearing rabbits appear, so he immediately takes it. 

The Fox and Cat steal the gold coins Pinocchio buried. The Talking Cricket informs Pinocchio about it. Pinocchio tells the judges about the Fox and Cat's theft, but was sentenced to five years in jail for foolishness. While there, Pinocchio meets Lucignolo, a thief that stole 29 lollipops from a candy shop (though the judges are shown eating them) who is being released. Four months later, during the celebration of the King's son's birth, Pinocchio is set free. He stumbles across the grave of the Blue Fairy, who supposedly died of grief because of his antics. 

A dove tells Pinocchio his father was heading out to sea to look for him. Pinocchio arrives at the shore, finding Geppetto on his ship and been knocked out by the waves. Pinocchio nearly drowns trying to save his father, then washes up by a city where he meets the Blue Fairy again. 

On his way to school, a kid throws a book at him, he ducks, and it hits Eugenio, who loses consciousness. Pinocchio is blamed for the crime. Upon nearing the Blue Fairy's house he escapes, ending up in a grape farmer's trap. Pinocchio is freed by Lucignolo and returns to the Blue Fairy's home. 

The next day, Lucignolo convinces Pinocchio to join him on a trip to 'Fun Forever Land'. When there, the Cricket tries to warn them all they will turn into donkeys if they do not leave and continue being bad. Pinocchio soon becomes a donkey and is sold to a circus ringmaster.

During his performance, Pinocchio gets hurt and is thrown into the sea, where he instantly returns to normal and is swallowed by a giant shark which coincidentally has also swallowed Geppetto. They escape together.

Pinocchio takes Geppetto to a farm to help him recover by helping out a farmer to get his father better, inside the farmer's paddock he sees a sick donkey who he immediately recognize as Lucignolo, but his friend tragically dies from working too hard.

Rewarding his efforts to strive for moral prudence, the Blue Fairy transforms him into a real boy. With his wish granted, he and his father sees his old puppet body in the corner of the house and sets off his actual first day of school.

Cast

Release
To promote the film's release, McDonald's sold Happy Meals containing toys that each resembled a character of the film.

In the United States and Canada, Miramax released the film on Christmas Day with no advance screening. Miramax said that this is because they needed to do post-production looping to insert the English dub for its English-speaking release. Edward Guthmann, a film reviewer for the San Francisco Chronicle, thought that this was because Miramax knew the film would not be well-received, and sought to have it released before critics placed their opinions on the film. The English version includes some differences, such as changed dialogues, some shortened scenes, and narration by David Suchet added. After the English dubbed version was poorly received, Miramax reissued the film in Italian with English subtitles on February 7, 2003.

Reception

Box-office
In Italy and Europe, Pinocchio grossed over $7 million within the first three days of its release. It went on to gross $3.67 million in the United States, and $37.7 million in other territories (of which €26 million was in Italy), for a worldwide total of $41.3 million, against a production budget of $40 million.

Critical reception

Original version
Pinocchio received mixed reviews. David Rooney of Variety wrote: 'In Roberto Benigni's take on Carlo Collodi's classic fairy tale, Pinocchio, the spirit of the late Federico Fellini - with whom Benigni talked of doing the project together - surfaces repeatedly. But that spirit fails to enliven a film substantially lacking in personality, energy, magic and humor ... The union between the Tuscan fairy tale and the region's most talented contemporary offspring would seem like the perfect marriage. In fact, it comes off as artificially exuberant and a little precious.' Roberto Nepoti of La Repubblica stated: "The film is a kind of linear translation of the book, illustrated by the splendid scenographies of Danilo Donati, played by good actors, accompanied by special effects of excellent levels but where, unfortunately, something is missing. What is missing is a visionary fantasy, a sense of excess, of the poetry that belongs to Benigni as an actor and author, but which Benigni as director has not yet acquired."

Pinocchio went on to receive six nominations at the David di Donatello Awards, winning two in the process: Best Sets and Decorations and Best Costumes, both to Danilo Donati. It was also nominated for at the Italian National Syndicate of Film Journalists.

American version

The English-dubbed recut version by Miramax was met with critical panning in the United States. On review aggregator website Rotten Tomatoes, the English-language version of the film, with 55 reviews, has a rare approval rating of 0% meaning no favorable reviews whatsoever  receiving an average rating of 2.70/10. The site's consensus states: "Roberto Benigni misfires wildly with this adaptation of Pinocchio, and the result is an unfunny, poorly-made, creepy vanity project". Metacritic gave the film an 11/100 based on 15 critics, which suggests 'overwhelming dislike'. Jonathan Rosenbaum stated on Chicago Reader that "the recut American version is truly awful, but a good 75% of the awfulness is attributable to Miramax". Audiences polled by CinemaScore gave the film an average grade of "D+" on an A+ to F scale.

Amongst other issues, the English dub was heavily criticized, with many critics also finding that Breckin Meyer being chosen as Benigni's voice was inappropriate and that he was too young. David Noh of Film Journal International referred to Meyer's performance as a "ridiculously inappropriate Valley Boy voice". Elvis Mitchell of The New York Times stated that the voices "are so sloppy you might feel as if you're watching a 1978 Hong Kong action picture: the dubbed mouths of the Italian cast are probably still moving an hour after the film is over". Mitchell also called it "an oddity that will be avoided by millions of people" and criticized Benigni's decision to play the titular character, opining that his role as Pinocchio is 'as believable as Diana Ross playing Dorothy in The Wiz".

Ken Fox of TV Guide wrote: "there's no getting past the shockingly poorly dubbed voice work of the English-speaking cast; Meyer's voice is particularly shrill and grating", but praised Benigni's performance and make up effects, stating: "he's one Italian icon playing another, and physically, he's actually quite good" and  "the art direction is often exquisite, and the anthropomorphic animal characters are beautifully realized through clever makeup design".

Accolades
The original version was nominated for six David di Donatello Awards (winning two) and three Nastro d'Argento (winning one): 
David di Donatello:
Best Sets and Decorations (Danilo Donati) — won
Best Costumes (Danilo Donati) — won
Best Actor (Roberto Benigni)
Supporting Actor (Kim Rossi Stuart)
Best Cinematography (Dante Spinotti)
Best Score (Nicola Piovani)
Nastro d'Argento:
Nastro d'Argento for Best Score (Nicola Piovani) - won
Best Supporting Actor
Best Producer (Nicoletta Braschi)

The English dub was nominated for six Golden Raspberry Awards (a first for a foreign-language film) and won one:
 Worst Picture
 Worst Director
 Worst Screenplay
 Worst Actor (Roberto Benigni "Dubbed Godzilla-style" by Breckin Meyer) — won
 Worst Remake or Sequel
 Worst Screen Couple (Roberto Benigni and Nicoletta Braschi)

See also
 List of films with a 0% rating on Rotten Tomatoes
 Pinocchio (2019) – another adaption that Roberto Benigni starred in, but this time in a different role (as Geppetto).

References

External links
 
 
 
 

2002 films
2002 comedy-drama films
2002 fantasy films
2000s children's comedy films
2000s children's drama films
2000s children's fantasy films
2000s fantasy comedy-drama films
Children's comedy-drama films
Films about giants
Films directed by Roberto Benigni
Films shot in Malta
Films shot in Tuscany
Films with screenplays by Vincenzo Cerami
Golden Raspberry Award winning films
Italian children's films
Italian fantasy comedy-drama films
2000s Italian-language films
Pinocchio films
Films scored by Nicola Piovani
Films distributed by Disney